Birch's Views of Philadelphia was an 1800 book of prints drawn and engraved by William Russell Birch (1755–1834) and his son Thomas Birch (1779–1851). The 27 illustrations of the city are extraordinarily valuable to historians because they document Philadelphia architecture and street-life at the beginning of the nineteenth century.

Formally titled The City of Philadelphia, in the State of Pennsylvania North America; as it appeared in the Year 1800, the volume was self-published by William Birch in December 1800. Birch was a British-born miniature painter and engraver, and this became his most famous work.

Philadelphia was the temporary capital of the United States when the Birches began the project in 1798, and among the 156 subscribers to the initial printing was Vice-President Thomas Jefferson. Other subscribers included British Minister to the U.S. Robert Liston, Spanish Minister to the U.S. The Chevalier d'Yrujo, former-Pennsylvania Governor Thomas Mifflin, New York City Mayor Richard Varick, the architect Benjamin Latrobe, the painter Edward Savage, and numerous members of Congress. The 1804 second edition listed former-President John Adams as a subscriber.

The views depict monuments, everyday life, and even reflect politics of the era. Plate 28 shows a technological marvel, the Water Works in Center Square, a water tower fed by steam pumps that made Philadelphia the first city in the United States with a general water-supply system. Two of the plates portray Native American delegations touring the city, and at least two plates include African Americans. Plate 29 shows the USS Frigate Philadelphia being built in a Southwark shipyard, but the engraving's ominous title, "Preparation for WAR to defend Commerce," refers to the 1798-1800 Quasi-War with France, in which hundreds of American merchant vessels were boarded or seized.

The Birches created additional views, and updated old ones — notably, reworking a view of Market Street to show the December 26, 1799 national funeral procession for George Washington. Birch's Views sold well and went into multiple editions, inspiring the pair to publish similar collected views of New York City, and of suburban estates surrounding Philadelphia and Baltimore.

First edition

Later editions
William and Thomas Birch published a second edition in 1804, a third edition in 1809, and a fourth (and final) edition in 1828.

References

External links
William Birch, The Country Seats of the United States (1808), Emily T. Cooperman, ed. (University of Pennsylvania Press, 2008).
Emily T. Cooperman & Lea Carson Sherk, William Birch: Picturing the American Scene (University of Pennsylvania Press, 2010).
Martin P. Snyder, "William Birch: His Philadelphia Views," Pennsylvania Magazine of History and Biography, vol. 73 (1949), pp. 271–315.
Martin P. Snyder, "Birch's Philadelphia Views: New Discoveries," Pennsylvania Magazine of History and Biography, vol. 88 (1964), pp. 164–173.
S. Robert Teitelman, Birch's Views of Philadelphia: a reduced facsimile of 'The City of Philadelphia-- as it appeared in the Year 1800': with photographs of the sites in 1960 & 1982. (Free Library of Philadelphia, 1982).
S. Robert Teitelman, Birch's Views of Philadelphia: A 200th Anniversary Edition. (Free Library of Philadelphia, 2000).

History of Philadelphia
1800 in Pennsylvania
1800 non-fiction books
1800s architecture in the United States
18th-century engravings
18th century in Philadelphia
Self-published books